The American College of Emergency Physicians (ACEP) is a professional organization of emergency medicine physicians in the United States.

The organization was founded August 16, 1968, by eight physicians in Lansing, Michigan.   ACEP established the American Board of Emergency Medicine (ABEM) in 1976.  ACEP publishes the Annals of Emergency Medicine and the Journal of the American College of Emergency Physicians Open (JACEP Open).

See also
 American College of Osteopathic Emergency Physicians
 American Academy of Emergency Medicine
 Academic Emergency Medicine
 Society for Academic Emergency Medicine

References

External links
 

Medical associations based in the United States
Emergency medicine organisations
Medical and health organizations based in Texas
American emergency physicians
1968 establishments in the United States